Eightball Records is an American independent record label established 1990 in New York City by Alex Kaplan, DJ Smash, and A&R head Kevin Williams. It played an important role in the development of house music, techno, and deep house in the 1990s.

History
Eightball was formed 1990 Wayne Hunter and Alex Kaplan in New York City. Originally a vinyl store, it specialized in recording and selling many dance and house music records. It later became an official recording label. Kaplan hired Kevin Williams and John Creamer as the label's A&Rs, and Serebe Kironde as the General Manager.

The label became home to a wide range of artists such as Joi Cardwell, Screamin Rachael, Mack Vibe, Lectroluv, Mix Master G-Flexx, Zoel, Napoleon Soul O, and co-owner DJ Smash. The label's debut single "Come On Girl" by Napoleon Soul O and C.J. Smith was released in 1991. Cardwell, who was recruited in 1994, premiered her debut single "Trouble" at the Billboard Dance Music Summit. The song became the label's first charting single which peaked at number 11 on the Dance chart.

In 1998, Jerome Farley became the Director of A&R of Eightball and subsidiary Empire State Records.

Subsidiaries
 Empire State Records

Discography
This list contains selected studio and compilation album releases on Eightball Records.
1994 
 Groove Thing – The Adventure
 Lectroluv – The Difference
 Lectroluv – Remix Project
 Mack Vibe – Mr. Meaner
 Paul 'Trouble' Anderson – The Sound Of New York

1995
 Joi Cardwell – The World Is Full of Trouble
 Lectroluv – The Original Collection
 Butter Foundation – East Side Drive/Anati
 Eightball, Corner Pocket (record label compilation album)
 Frankie Bones – 2 Clues EP

1996
 BlueJean – Try My Lovin'''
 B Factor – Make It Better Jazz Not Jazz: The Original Collection (record label compilation album)
 The Girl! – Fired Up: The Remixes1997
 Joi Cardwell – Joi Cardwell 
 Groove Thing – This Is No Time Peace Bureau – Inner City Booms Easy One (record label compilation album)

1998
 Joi Cardwell – 8 Ball EP Mix Master G-Flexx – We Shine The Soul of Eightball (record label compilation album)
 Christian Scott – The Enchanter Chants EP Æther – Give Away My Fear''

See also
 List of independent record labels
 List of record labels

References

External links
 

1990 establishments in New York City
Electronic music record labels
Entertainment companies established in 1990
American independent record labels
New York (state) record labels
Pop record labels
Record labels established in 1990
Techno record labels